The mixed singles snooker competition at the 2017 World Games took place from 26 to 30 July 2017 at the Wroclaw Congress Center in Wrocław, Poland.

Aditya Mehta was the defending champion but he lost 1–3 in the first round to Kacper Filipiak.

Bracket

Final

Century breaks
 136, 113  Ali Carter
 127  Kyren Wilson

References

Snooker - mixed singles
2017 in snooker
Snooker in Poland
Snooker at the World Games